Tsing Yi Municipal Services Building, also known as Tsing Yi Complex, formerly  Tsing Yi Regional Council Complex, is a multi-purpose municipal building for the Tsing Yi Island, Hong Kong. It was built by the former Regional Council. The building hosts Tsing Yi Public Library, Tsing Yi Indoor Recreation Centre, Tsing Yi Market, and offices for Hong Kong Government.

History
The building was completed in March 1999. It building cost about HK$292 million. 

The building was jointly designed by the Architectural Services Department and Andrew Ng Architects Limited. It received a Certificate of Merit at the 1999 Hong Kong Institute of Architects Annual Awards.

Description
The ground floor of the complex houses a market. The first floor is home to a public library. The second floor houses an indoor sports centre with an arena, squash courts, and a fitness room. The complex also has several public art pieces.

Photo gallery

References

Tsing Yi
Buildings and structures in Hong Kong